Reparata can refer to:

People
Saint Reparata, Christian martyr

Places
Santa Reparata, Florence, church in Florence
Santa-Reparata-di-Balagna, town in Corsica
Santa-Reparata-di-Moriani, town in Corsica

Music
Reparata and the Delrons, musical group

See also
Santa Reparata International School of Art